In enzymology, a diphosphoinositol-polyphosphate diphosphatase is an enzyme that catalyzes the chemical reaction

diphospho-myo-inositol polyphosphate + H2O  myo-inositol polyphosphate + phosphate

Thus, the two substrates of this enzyme are diphospho-myo-inositol polyphosphate and H2O, whereas its two products are myo-inositol polyphosphate and phosphate.

This enzyme belongs to the family of hydrolases, specifically those acting on acid anhydrides in phosphorus-containing anhydrides.  The systematic name of this enzyme class is diphospho-myo-inositol-polyphosphate diphosphohydrolase. Other names in common use include diphosphoinositol-polyphosphate phosphohydrolase, and DIPP.

Structural studies

References

 
 

EC 3.6.1
Enzymes of known structure